Alfie Stewart (born 24 December 1993) is an English actor. His notable films are Not Fade Away (2012), The Knife That Killed Me (2014), The Throwaways (2014), and The Outpost (2020). He is best known for his role as Keith Woods, the lead character in the series Sadie J.

Filmography

Film

Television

References

External links
 

1993 births
Living people
English male film actors
English male television actors
English male child actors
Male actors from London
People from Islington (district)